A digital detox is a period of time when a person voluntarily refrains from using digital devices such as smartphones, computers, and social media platforms. This form of detoxification has gained popularity, as individuals have increased their time spent on digital devices and the Internet.

Background 

A 2015 survey conducted by Deloitte found that around 59% of smartphone users check a social media platform in the five minutes prior to going to bed, and within 30 minutes of waking up.

Motivations 
Motivations to start a digital detox include: 
 Concern about developing addictive behavior that some identify as an Internet addiction disorder
 Aiming to reduce stress and anxiety caused by the over-use of technology
 Re-focusing offline social interactions and actions
 Re-connecting with nature
 Increasing mindfulness
 Improving one's learning ability by decreasing distractions and eliminating multi-tasking

Potential health effects 

The extended overuse of technology has been found to reduce quality of sleep, cause eye strain and vision problems, as well as lead to the increased occurrence of migraine headaches. A previous research survey of over 7,000 participants found that approximately 70% of those who use technology with screens have experienced "digital eye strain as a result of the growing use of [screen possessing technological devices]".

Research on the effects of popular technological devices such as cellphones and computers on sleep has suggested that the light emitted from screens may suppress the production of the hormone melatonin, an important regulatory biochemical that controls the duration and character of sleep cycles.

Potential effects on relationships 
A study of 145 American adults recruited through MTurk in 2016 suggested that marital satisfaction can be lowered if either partner "snubs" the other in favor of using a cellphone. The act was also associated with a higher incidence of depression and a reported lower satisfaction with life. The self-reported attachment styles of the participants were seen to have an effect such that individuals with attachment anxiety reported a higher degree of cell phone conflict.

Another study suggested that the visible presence of mobile devices during conversations may have a limiting effect on the sense of connection felt between those involved in the conversation as well as the overall quality of the conversation.

Social media detoxification
A subset of digital detox is social media detox, which is a period of time when individuals voluntarily stay away from social media. In academic research, social media detoxification is commonly referred to as the "non-use of social media", and falls under the umbrella of "Digital Detox", with a focus specifically on unplugging from social media.

A 2019 Pew Research Center study found that 69% of adults in the United States used Facebook, 73% used YouTube, and 37% used Instagram. A 2012 study found that around 60% of Facebook users have made a conscious effort to voluntarily take a break from Facebook for a time period of several weeks or more. This has been referred to as "media refusal", with non-users known as "social media rejectors" who once used social media but have now voluntarily given it up for various reasons.

Methods 
A subset of a digital detox is a social media detox, in which an individual voluntarily keeps off of social media platforms. Motivations for performing only a subset of a digital detox could be attributed to the total time spent on social media platforms and the related psychological effects.  The use of social media can lead to internet addiction and decrease productivity which is why celebrities such as Ed Sheeran and Kendall Jenner have undergone a social media detox and influenced others to do one as well. Comedian Ari Shaffir gained attention for refusing to use a smartphone after concerns about spending too much time on it, especially on social media. A study found that the average user will spend 5 years and 4 months on social media, which is second only to watching TV, which is at 7 years and 8 months. Many social media users will also visit their platforms multiple times per day, with 68% of Snapchat users and 50% of Facebook users doing so. Based on a 2019 Pew Research Center study, 73% of adults in the United States use YouTube, 37% use Instagram and 69% use Facebook with around 60% of Facebook users making an effort to undergo a social media detoxification.

Most experts agree that moderation is a much more effective method of detoxification than fully forgoing technology. One way of curbing overuse of digital devices is to allocate some of the uses of a smartphone to non-digital means. In 2019 Google announced a "paper phone" which can contain daily agendas, directions, and other uses so that people rely less on their smartphone.

Designated 'sacred spaces' wherein smartphone usage is strictly prohibited can help.

Recently, the tourism industry has found a niche market for 'digital detox travel packages' where tourists are disconnected from their Information and communications technology by traveling to remote areas. A study from University of Nottingham Ningbo China found that the biggest motivators for embarking on a digital detox holiday include mindfulness, technostress, relaxation, and self-expression.

Criticism
In the 2010s, technology and social media became an integral aspect of everyday life, and thus the decision to refrain from using technology or social media has become a conscious lifestyle choice reflecting the desire for selective and reversible disconnection. In the digital age, social media plays a vital role in building social capital, maintaining connections, and managing impressions. Scholars have argued for the importance of maintaining a certain level of distraction that social media can provide for a balanced state of body and mind, and some scholars have even argued that social media is necessary and should not be completely cut out. That being said, many scholars believe that the moderation of social media is essential, primarily due to social media platforms' goal of encouraging constant use with likes, notifications, and infinite scrolling. To lessen the effects of these addictive features social media platforms such as Instagram have begun to explore alternative methods, such as making likes on a user's post invisible to the user, to shift the focus away from constant notifications and likes.

Some companies have even launched movements against technology addiction. For example, in October 2019, Google released Paper Phone, a Google product consisting of a printed piece of paper folded into eighths that contains relevant information to your day much like a daily planner. The motive behind the project was to provide the utility of a smartphone in a simplistic and less dynamic delivery. Other projects have focused on building second phones with less functionality, or putting human nature and design above technology. Some critics disagree with Google's approach to the digital detox phenomenon, however, and instead argue that harmony between technology use and well-being can be achieved. These critics suggest that the best way to digitally detox is to be mindful of the amount of time that is being spent on a digital device.

See also

 Delayed gratification
 Digital media use and mental health
 Dopamine fasting
 Problematic social media use
 Shutdown Day

References

Digital media use and mental health
Internet culture
Internet terminology